Mucalinda, Muchalinda or Mucilinda is the name of a nāga, a snake-like being, who protected the Gautama Buddha from the elements after his enlightenment.

It is said that six weeks after Gautama Buddha began meditating under the Bodhi Tree, the heavens darkened for seven days, and a prodigious rain descended. However, the mighty King of Serpents, Mucalinda, came from beneath the earth and protected with his hood the One who is the source of all protection. When the great storm had cleared, the serpent king assumed his human form, bowed before the Buddha, and returned in joy to his palace.

Development
Mucalinda first appears in the Mucalinda Sutta, where it is described that the naga king protected Buddha from the elements by encircling Buddha's body seven times with his coils and standing with his hood spread over. After Buddha finished meditating and the sky cleared, Mucalinda adopted the form of a youth and bowed before him.

The first existent artwork depicting Mucalinda comes from a 2nd century BC stupa in Pauni, Maharashtra, where the naga is portrayed as having five heads and guarding Buddha's empty seat. Contemporaneous artwork from Sanchi has him portrayed in zoo-antropomorphic form and attended by a retinue of nagini.

Artistic representations

The subject of Buddha meditating under the protection of Mucalinda is very common in Lao Buddhist art. A particularly striking gigantic modern rendition is present in Bunleua Sulilat's sculpture park Sala Keoku.

Art depicting Buddha with Mucalinda's hood over him with might have been influenced by Jain art of Parshvanatha, himself represented as a man with a cobra-like hood.

In popular culture
The legend of Mucalinda (Muchalinda) is prominently featured in Aldous Huxley's novel Island where it functions as a metaphor of communion between humans and nature, in opposition to the hostile/cautious view of snakes in the Western culture.

The webcomic Sinfest featured a version of this in a sunday strip in 2010.

References

Buddhist legendary creatures
Nāgas
Indian legendary creatures